An-Magritt is a 1969 Norwegian drama film directed by Arne Skouen, starring Liv Ullmann. The film is based on two novels by Johan Falkberget: Plogjernet and An-Magritt.

An-Magritt (Ullmann) grows up in a Norwegian mining town. She is born as a result of her mother being raped. Her mother later kills herself after being put in the stocks for an extramarital affair with a soldier. An-Magritt is then raised by her grandfather, and has to work with the men to get by.

External links
 
 An-Magritt at Filmweb.no (Norwegian)
 An-Magritt at the Norwegian Film Institute

1969 films
1969 drama films
Films based on multiple works of a series
Films directed by Arne Skouen
Norwegian drama films